The 2019 AFL Women's season was the third season of the AFL Women's competition, the highest level senior Australian rules football competition in Australia.

It ran from 2 February until 31 March, and comprised a 7-game home-and-away season followed by a finals series featuring four clubs.

Reforms

New teams
The North Melbourne team has a strong Tasmanian focus; some players are based in Tasmania and some home games were held in the state. The introduction of the new teams is the first stage of a two-year expansion that will take the league to fourteen teams for the 2020 season.

Conferences
Despite the introduction of new teams, the league retained a seven-round home-and-away season. This was achieved by splitting the competition into two conferences. Each team play four games against their fellow conference members and three "cross-over" matches against teams from the other conference. Conference membership was based on the final ladder positions of the 2018 season.

The finals series was expanded to include preliminary finals for the first time; the two teams who finish the highest in each conference at the end of the home-and-away season qualified for the preliminary finals. The winners of these games played in the AFL Women's Grand Final. The make-up of the conferences, along with the fixture, was released in October 2018.

The conference system proved controversial as the teams in Conference A consistently outplayed the teams on Conference B, resulting in the first, second, fifth and sixth best overall teams making the finals.

Rule changes

There were 11 rule changes brought in for the 2019 AFLW season (three AFLW specific).

Boundary throw ins brought in by 10m (AFLW only)
Last touch rule only applies outside of the 50s (AFLW only)
Runners allowed on the field during live play (AFLW only)
5-6-5 formation mandated at centre bounces
The woman on the mark must stand further back after kick ins after a behind (from 5m to 10m), and the player doesn't need to kick to herself before playing on
After defenders have a free kick within nine metres of their goal, the woman on the mark stands in line with the top of the goal square
Players can't set up behind the umpire at centre bounces
Play on is allowed for 50m penalties
Players can kick across their body after taking a mark after the siren.
A player can place her hands on the back of her opponent to protect marking space (see Push in the back)
A ruck who takes direct possession of the ball from a bounce, throw-up or boundary throw-in will no longer be regarded as having had prior opportunity.

Premiership season
The full fixture and make-up of the conferences was released on 26 October 2018.
All starting times are local.

Round 1

Round 2

Round 3

Round 4

Round 5

Round 6

Round 7

Ladders

Ladder progression
Numbers highlighted in green indicates the team finished the round inside the top 2.

Conference A

Conference B

Win/Loss table

Bold – Home game
X – Bye
Opponent for round listed above margin
This table can be sorted by margin, winners are represented in the first half of each column, and losers are represented in the second half of each column once sorted

Finals series

Preliminary finals

Grand final

Attendances

By club

By ground

Awards
The league best and fairest was awarded to Erin Phillips.
The Rising Star was awarded to Madison Prespakis.
The best on ground in the AFL Women's Grand Final was awarded to Erin Phillips.
The goal of the year was awarded to Ashley Sharp.
The mark of the year was awarded to Tayla Harris.
AFLW Players Association awards
The most valuable player was awarded to Erin Phillips.
The most courageous player was awarded to Chelsea Randall.
The best captain was awarded to Brianna Davey.
The best first year player was awarded to Madison Prespakis.
The AFLW Coaches Association champion player of the year was awarded to Erin Phillips.
Erin Phillips was named the captain of the 2019 AFL Women's All-Australian team. The premiers  had five players selected, with nine of the league's 10 clubs represented in the final team by at least one player.
 were the lowest ranked team overall, and thus could be said to have "won" the wooden spoon, though this is a contestable claim given the use of conferences.

Best and fairest

AFLW leading goalkicker
Numbers highlighted in blue indicates the player led the season's goal kicking tally at the end of that round.

Source: https://www.afl.com.au/womens/matches/stats

Coach changes

Club leadership

See also
2018 AFL Women's draft

References

External links
 Official AFL Women's website

 
AFL Women's seasons
2019 in Australian rules football